Mikhail Petrovich Ivanov; born 20 November 1977 in Ostrov, Soviet Union) is a Russian cross-country skier who competed from 1996 to 2007. He finished second in the 50 km at the 2002 Winter Olympics in Salt Lake City to Spain's Johann Mühlegg, but was awarded the gold medal upon Mühlegg's blood-doping disqualification of darbepoetin alfa.

Ivanov's won the bronze medal in the 30 km event at the 2001 FIS Nordic World Ski Championships in Lahti. He also won two World Cup events in his career (30 km: 2000, 15 km: 2001).

Cross-country skiing results
All results are sourced from the International Ski Federation (FIS).

Olympic Games
 1 medal – (1 gold)

World Championships
 1 medal – (1 bronze)

World Cup

Season standings

Individual podiums
 2 victories – (2 )
 4 podiums – (4 )

Team podiums
 1 victory – (1 )
 11 podiums – (11 )

References

External links

1977 births
Living people
People from Ostrov, Pskov Oblast
Russian male cross-country skiers
Cross-country skiers at the 2002 Winter Olympics
Olympic cross-country skiers of Russia
Olympic gold medalists for Russia
Olympic medalists in cross-country skiing
FIS Nordic World Ski Championships medalists in cross-country skiing
Medalists at the 2002 Winter Olympics
Sportspeople from Pskov Oblast
Fifth convocation members of the State Duma (Russian Federation)